Desislava Cove (‘Zaliv Desislava’ \'za-liv de-si-'sla-va\) is the 3.3 km wide cove indenting for 3 km Nordenskjöld Coast in Graham Land west of Cape Worsley.  It was formed as a result of the retreat of Aleksiev Glacier and Kladorub Glacier in the early 21st century.  The feature is named after the Bulgarian sebastokratorissa Desislava (13th century).

Location
British mapping in 1978.

Maps
 British Antarctic Territory.  Scale 1:200000 topographic map.  DOS 610 Series, Sheet W 64 60.  Directorate of Overseas Surveys, Tolworth, UK, 1978.
 Antarctic Digital Database (ADD). Scale 1:250000 topographic map of Antarctica. Scientific Committee on Antarctic Research (SCAR). Since 1993, regularly upgraded and updated.

Notes

References
 Desislava Cove. SCAR Composite Antarctic Gazetteer.
 Bulgarian Antarctic Gazetteer. Antarctic Place-names Commission. (details in Bulgarian, basic data in English)

External links
 Desislava Cove. Copernix satellite image

Coves of Graham Land
Nordenskjöld Coast
Bulgaria and the Antarctic